Asset TV is a UK-based digital media company, providing webcast, filming, production services, media hosting solutions, fund manager videos, global video, audio distribution and custom built analytics packages, to the global investment management industry.

History and overview
Asset TV was established in 2003. The four founder directors were: Chairman/CEO, Craig Walton (formerly group sales and marketing director for Framlington Group Ltd), Director, Tony Suckling (former visiting lecturer at Cranfield School of Management), David Mann (former managing director, Channel 4's 124 facilities) leaving and Business Development Director, John Glover (former sales director at Framlington and F&C).

Since the founding of Asset TV in 2003, Mark Colegate (formerly group editor at Incisive Media and investment weekly}, Neil Jeffery (formerly employed by Xpedite Systems from 2001–2003) and Andy Darvell (formerly production manager with Loveurope) joined Asset TV's board of directors.
Colegate began working at Asset TV in May 2008 as editorial director, responsible for content oversight. Jeffery joined Asset TV in 2003 having developed a client base of global asset management companies, becoming a director of Asset TV in January 2010. And, Andy Darvell has overseen Asset TV’s production services and media planning since 2007, and became a director of Asset TV in January 2011.

Asset TV provides on-demand video interviews of fund managers to professional fund buyers. It sets up and runs web-based channels and video syndication for third parties, which take and distribute content.

Filming partners

Asset TV filming partners include:

Awards and recognition

Hertfordshire Digital Awards - Bronze award for Best B2B Website 2016
Hertfordshire Digital Awards - Winner of Best Use of Video for Business 2015

References

External links

Mass media companies of the United Kingdom
Mass media companies established in 2003
Internet television channels